

Champions
World Series: Washington Senators over New York Giants (4-3)
First Negro World Series: Kansas City Monarchs over Hilldale (5-4-1)

Awards and honors

League Award
 Walter Johnson, Washington Senators, P
 Dazzy Vance, Brooklyn Dodgers, P

MLB statistical leaders

Major league baseball final standings

American League final standings

National League final standings

Negro leagues final standings

Negro National League final standings

† Indianapolis dropped out of the league in June and was replaced by Memphis.

Eastern Colored League final standings

Events
February 16 - Tony Boeckel, a third baseman for the Boston Braves, dies from injuries suffered in a car accident the previous day in San Diego. Yankees outfielder Bob Meusel was also in the car, which was driven by Bob Albright, who was a theater man from Los Angeles. Meusel and Albright escaped the crash with suffering serious injuries. Boeckel becomes the first major league player to die due to a car accident.
April 15
On opening day, two future Hall of Famers make their major league debuts, as Al Simmons makes his major league debut in the Philadelphia Athletics' season opener with the Washington Senators, and Freddie Lindstrom appears in the New York Giants opener with the Brooklyn Robins.
The contest between the Boston Braves and Philadelphia Phillies at the Baker Bowl ends in a 6-6 tie.
April 16 – Earle Combs makes his major league debut pinch hitting for Sad Sam Jones in the New York Yankees' 9-6 loss to the Boston Red Sox.
May 1 - Bill Barrett of the Chicago White Sox steals home in both the first and ninth inning of a game. In that game Chicago beat the Cleveland Indians 13-7.
May 23 - Walter Johnson strikes out six straight hitters en route to a fourteen strike out performance and a 4-0 over the Chicago White Sox.
May 31 – Red Ruffing gives up five hits and three earned runs in his major league debut.
June 26 – Jesse Barnes opposed Virgil Barnes in the first pitching matchup of brothers in major league history. Virgil did not have a decision while Jesse was credited with the loss as the New York Giants won the Boston Braves‚ 8-1. The Barnes brothers will match up four more times during their careers‚ the first, including three days from its date.
July 11 - Chicago Cubs first baseman Lee Cotter ties a major league record 21 put outs and one assist. However, the Cubs fall to the Dodgers 9-1.
July 14 – Rogers Hornsby goes three-for-four in the St. Louis Cardinals' 12-0 victory over the Brooklyn Robins to raise his season average to .402. His average remains above .400 for the remainder of the season.
July 17 – Jesse Haines of the St. Louis Cardinals pitches a no-hitter against the Boston Braves in a 5-0 win.
July 18 - The St. Louis Cardinals release pitcher Jeff Pfeffer. Pfeffer had flirted with what would have been his third 20 game win season just two years prior. He would sign on later with the Pittsburgh Pirates, and retire after the season. 
July 30 - The Philadelphia Athletics purchase the contract of sixteen year old Jimmie Foxx from Eastern of the eastern Shore league for $2,000. Fox would make his MLB debut the next season at the age of 17, en route to a hall of fame career.
August 27 – The New York Yankees are shut out for only the second time all season, 1-0 by Stan Coveleski and the Cleveland Indians.
August 28
The New York Yankees and Washington Senators open a crucial four game series at Yankee Stadium for first place in the American League. The Senators win 11-6 and take three of the four games of the series to leave New York with a 1.5 game lead.
Despite future Hall of Famer Chick Hafey making his major league debut in both games of their double header, the St. Louis Cardinals lose to the Chicago Cubs, 5-2 and 8-3. Hafey collects his first major league hit in the second game.
September 6 – The Boston Braves beat the Brooklyn Robins in the second game of a double header, 5-4, ending Brooklyn's fifteen-game winning streak.
September 7 – In a crucial battle for first place in the National League, the New York Giants defeat the Brooklyn Robins, 8-7, to increase their lead in the NL to 1.5 games.
September 16 – St. Louis Cardinals first baseman Jim Bottomley drives in twelve runs in the Cardinals' 17-3 victory over the Brooklyn Robins.
September 20 – Grover Cleveland Alexander of the Chicago Cubs records his 300th career win.
September 22 – With his Detroit Tigers holding a commanding lead over the Boston Red Sox, manager Ty Cobb brings in young prospect Charlie Gehringer as a defensive replacement at short. He does not log an at-bat in his major league debut.
September 28 – The Brooklyn Robins' Dazzy Vance pitches a gem to earn his league leading 28th win of the season over the Boston Braves. Vance also leads the league with a 2.16 earned run average and 262 strikeouts to earn the National League's first ever MVP award.
October 1 - Sen Kaney makes history calling the first live radio broadcast of a major league baseball game. Kaney is seated in the grandstand behind home plate, calling the game as the Cubs defeated the White Sox 10-7. 
October 4 – With the New York Giants up 2-1, the Washington Senators' Roger Peckinpaugh doubles in Ossie Bluege to send game one of the World Series goes into extra innings tied at two. The New York Giants score two in the twelfth, and win it, 4-3. Their long-time manager, John McGraw, made his ninth and final World Series appearance.
October 5 – Goose Goslin hits a two-run home run in the first inning to put the Washington Senators up 2-0 in game two of the World Series. The Giants tie it in the top of the Ninth, only to lose it in the bottom of the ninth on an RBI double by Roger Peckinpaugh.
October 6 – At the Polo Grounds, the New York Giants win game three of the World Series, 6-4.
October 7 – A three-run home run by Goose Goslin powers the Washington Senators past the New York Giants in game four of the World Series.
October 8 – American League MVP Walter Johnson takes his second loss of the 1924 World Series, as the New York Giants beat him and the Washington Senators, 6–2.
October 9 – With two outs in the fifth inning, Bucky Harris drives in two runs with a single to right, and the Senators win game six of the World Series, 2–1.
October 10 – The Washington Senators defeat the New York Giants, 4-3, in twelve innings, in Game seven of the World Series to win their first World Championship. This was the second extra-inning World Series–deciding game and the last before . The 1991 World Series is won by the very same franchise, by then known as the Minnesota Twins.

Births

January
January 1 – Charlie Bishop
January 1 – Arleene Johnson
January 1 – Earl Torgeson
January 5 – Fred Marsh
January 7 – Jim Pendleton
January 9 – John Hall
January 16 – Junior Wooten
January 18 – José Luis García

February
February 4 – Dorothy Harrell
February 6 – Dorothy Montgomery
February 7 – Paul Owens
February 8 – Joe Black
February 11 – Hal Rice
February 19 – Margie Lang
February 20 – Sal Yvars
February 21 – Lloyd Hittle
February 23 – Phil Haugstad
February 25 – Jack Lohrke
February 29 – Al Rosen

March
March 1 – Wilmer Harris
March 1 – Tim Thompson
March 2 – Cal Abrams
March 4 – Jack Brittin
March 5 – Ramón García
March 6 – Ed Mierkowicz
March 6 – Bud Podbielan
March 8 – Toby Atwell
March 10 – John Perkovich
March 18 – Garvin Hamner
March 27 – Walt Linden

April
April 2 – Bobby Ávila
April 4 – Gil Hodges
April 6 – Tokuji Iida
April 18 – Jim Zapp
April 20 – Jim Bilbrey
April 23 – Chuck Harmon
April 25 – Art Schallock
April 27 – Bill Higdon
April 27 – Frank Wurm
April 29 – Freddy Rodríguez

May
May 5 – Mildred Meacham
May 7 – Al Cihocki
May 11 – Frank Campos
May 11 – Helen Filarski
May 13 – Cliff Fannin
May 21 – Ed Fitz Gerald
May 23 – Clyde King
May 24 – Hubert Simmons
May 27 – Tom Hurd
May 29 – Pepper Paire
May 30 – Turk Lown

June
June 3 – George Armstrong
June 4 – June Emerson
June 5 – Lou Brissie
June 16 – Jane Jacobs
June 16 – Ernie Johnson
June 18 – Erma Bergmann
June 18 – Marie Kruckel
June 19 – Jim Blackburn
June 23 – Harry Schaeffer

July
July 1 – Jack Bruner
July 1 – Ken Wood
July 6 – Frank Kellert
July 7 – John Simmons
July 11 – Al Federoff
July 15 – Bob Barthelson
July 20 – Claude Crocker
July 24 – Tod Davis
July 26 – Milt Welch
July 28 – Marie Menheer

August
August 2 – Lloyd Merriman
August 5 – Rube Novotney
August 5 – Eddie Yuhas
August 6 – Van Fletcher
August 15 – Mary Lawson
August 15 – Frank Whitman
August 17 – Larry Ciaffone
August 20 – George Zuverink
August 21 – Jack Buck
August 21 – Vern Fear
August 23 – Sherm Lollar
August 26 – Alex Kellner
August 29 – Wayne McLeland
August 30 – Frank Sacka
August 31 – Adeline Kerrar

September
September 1 – Ed Samcoff
September 3 – Bill Greason
September 4 – León Kellman
September 6 – Jim Fridley
September 6 – Hal Jeffcoat
September 6 – George Schmees
September 10 – Ted Kluszewski
September 11 – Pauline Crawley
September 11 – Lou Grasmick
September 12 – George Bradshaw
September 12 – Bubba Church
September 14 – Patricia Barringer
September 14 – Jerry Coleman
September 15 – Jim Davis
September 19 – Vern Benson
September 21 – Marie Mahoney
September 23 – Dino Restelli
September 25 – Red Webb
September 26 – Eddie Erautt
September 27 – Jerry Scala
September 29 – Ed McGhee

October
October 1 – Betty Russell
October 2 – Bill Serena
October 13 – Charlie Silvera
October 14 – Dave Jolly
October 14 – Bill Renna
October 16 – Bob Cain
October 22 – Ernestine Petras
October 25 – Bobby Brown
October 29 – Hal Bamberger
October 31 – Dee Fondy

November
November 2 – George Estock
November 5 – Sonny Dixon
November 11 – Evelyn Wawryshyn
November 12 – Andy Hansen
November 18 – Rocky Nelson
November 21 – Warren Hacker
November 23 – Josephine D'Angelo
November 24 – Joanne Winter
November 27 – Cal Howe
November 29 – Irv Noren

December
December 2 – Sylvia Wronski
December 3 – Fred Taylor
December 9 – Jerry Fahr
December 11 – Hal Brown
December 13 – George Shuba
December 18 – Geraldine Bureker
December 19 – Rex Barney
December 19 – Herb Gorman
December 21 – Marge Villa
December 23 – Bob Marquis
December 24 – Chico García
December 28 – Steve Kuczek
December 31 – Ted Gray

Deaths

January
January 4 – John Peters, 73, 19th century shortstop for four clubs, including the pennant-winning 1876 Chicago White Stockings in the very first year of the National League.
January 9 – George Hodson, 55, pitcher.
January 15 – Pat Friel, 63, American Association outfielder who played from 1890 to 1891 for the Syracuse Stars and Philadelphia Athletics.

February
February 7 – George Kahler, 34, pitcher.
February 16 – Pop-Boy Smith, 31, pitcher.
February 27 – Thomas Lynch, 65, National League president from 1910 through 1913, previously a highly regarded umpire from 1888 to 1899.

March
March 7 – Pat Moran, 48, catcher/third baseman for three National League teams from 1901 through 1914, including the 1907 Chicago Cubs World Champion team, who later became the first manager to lead two different teams to their first-ever modern-era National League championships, the 1915 Philadelphia Phillies and the 1919 Cincinnati Reds, capturing the 1919 World Series title.
March 8 – Myron Allen, 69, outfielder/pitcher for four teams in two different leagues from 1883 through 1888.
March 17 – Bill Harbridge, 68, catcher/outfielder for five teams of three different leagues between the 1875 and 1884 seasons.

April
April 4 – George Wood, 65, left fielder in 13 seasons from 1880 to 1992, mainly for the Detroit Wolverines and the Philadelphia Athletics, who posted a .300 average twice and led the National League in home runs in 1882.
April 8 – Jimmy Macullar, 69, infielder/outfielder/pitcher for three teams between 1879 and 1886, who holds a Major League lifetime record for the most games played at shortstop for a left-handed thrower with 325 appearances in the position, while leading the American Association in putouts at outfield in 1882 and as a shortstop in 1885.
April 16 – Buster Hoover, 61, utility infielder/outfielder for four teams between 1884 and 1892.
April 26 – Moxie Manuel, 42, pitcher.
April 28 – Barney McFadden, 47, pitcher.

May
May 9 – Bill Wilson, 56, catcher.
May 11 – John Stedronsky, 73, third baseman.
May 11 – Fleet Walker, 67, catcher for the 1884 Toledo Blue Stockings, who is credited with being the first African American to play professional baseball.
May 15 – Ed Swartwood, 65, right fielder/first baseman who topped the American Association in batting average during the 1883 season, led the league in runs, doubles and total bases the following season, and later became an umpire.
May 16 – Candy Cummings, 75, Hall of Fame pitcher credited with developing the curveball in 1867, who won 28 or more games for four teams of the National Association and later became a Minor League executive.
May 25 – Carl Weilman, 34, pitcher who posted an 84-93 record and a 2.67 earned run average in 239 games for the American League St. Louis Browns between 1912 and 1920.
May 26 – Ed MacGamwell, 46, first baseman.

June
June 2 – Jim Hughes, 50, pitcher for the Baltimore Orioles and Brooklyn Superbas National League clubs, who led the league's pitchers with 28 wins in the 1899 season.
June 5 – Bill Reynolds, 39, catcher.
June 5 – John Sullivan, 51, catcher.
June 23 – Shorty Gallagher, 52, outfielder.

July
July 3 – Ed Householder, 54, outfielder.
July 9 – Bill McCloskey, 70, catcher and outfielder.
July 27 – Bob Dresser, 45, pitcher.

August
August 4 – George Nicol, 53, pitcher and outfielder.
August 17 – John E. Bruce, 67, secretary of the National Commission from 1903 to 1920, previously legal counsel to American League president and also part owner of the St. Louis Browns from 1902 to 1916.
August 19 – Bill Keister, 53, middle infielder for seven different teams in seven seasons, who led the American League with 21 triples in 1901.

September
September 3 – Herman Pitz, 59, catcher.
September 7 – Bob Spade, 47, pitcher.
September 15 – Frank Chance, 47, Hall of Fame first baseman and manager of the Chicago Cubs, who anchored famed infield of four National League and two World Series champions from 1906–1910; batted .300 four times; topped the league in runs once and steals twice; led the 1906 squad to a winning-record 116 games, while collecting a career-winning percentage of .593 (second highest among managers of 1500 or more games), and stole 401 bases to set a career-mark for first basemen.
September 18 – Bill Geiss, 66, pitcher for the 1882 Baltimore Orioles and second baseman for the 1884 Detroit Wolverines.
September 24 – Dan McFarlan, 50, pitcher.

October
October 9 – Ed Caskin, 72, shortstop.
October 9 – Jake Daubert, 40, first baseman who compiled a .303 career average with 2,326 hits in 2,014 career games for Brooklyn (1910–1918) and Cincinnati (1919 until his death); won batting titles in 1913 and 1914, and led the National League in triples two times; 1913 NL Most Valuable Player; captain for pennant winners in Brooklyn and Cincinnati and member of the Reds' 1919 World Series champions.
October 27 – Percy Haughton, 48, renowned Ivy League football coach (Harvard, Cornell, Columbia) who was president and co-owner of the Boston Braves from 1916 to 1918.
October 29 – Pop Snyder, 70, catcher for several teams over 18 seasons including 1878 Boston champions; also managed Cincinnati to 1882 American Association pennant.

November
November 6 – Emil Leber, 43, third baseman.
November 14 – Joe Quest, 71, second baseman for 10 seasons.  Started for three Chicago White Stockings championship teams.

December
December 1 – Dolly Stark, 39, murdered, who played at shortstop for the Cleveland Naps and the Brooklyn Dodgers from 1909 through 1912.
December 1 – Dummy Stephenson, 55, outfielder.
December 11 – Moxie Hengel, 67, second baseman.
December 14 – Chappie McFarland, 49, pitcher.
December 17 – Pat Dealy, 63, catcher.
December 20 – Jimmy Woulfe, 65, outfielder.
December 24 – Doc Gessler, 44, Major League outfielder during eight seasons, who later managed in the outlaw Federal League for the 1914 Pittsburgh Rebels.
December 29 – Bill White, 64, shortstop in five season from 1883 to 1888.